Lithuania participated at the 2010 Winter Olympics in Vancouver, British Columbia, Canada.

Alpine skiing

Cross-country skiing

Biathlon

Figure skating 
Lithuania had qualified an entry in the ice dancing event when  Deividas Stagniūnas and Katherine Copely placed 14th at the 2009 World Figure Skating Championships. However, Copely is an American and did not have Lithuanian citizenship, required to enter the Olympics for Lithuania. Her special request for citizenship was denied by President Dalia Grybauskaitė. The spot was left unfilled.

References

2010 in Lithuanian sport
Nations at the 2010 Winter Olympics
2010